Manasariyathe is a 1984 Indian Malayalam-language thriller film directed by Soman Ambaat and written by Velliman Vijayan. It stars Mohanlal, Zarina Wahab and Nedumudi Venu. The film's songs were composed by Raghu Kumar, while the background score was provided by Pukazhenthi.

Plot

A womanizer frequently troubles a happy family. This leads the husband to threaten the guy publicly. The next day the guy turns up in the family house as a corpse. How the family deals with the corpse and who was responsible for the death is the rest of the movie.

Cast
 Mohanlal as Mammootty
 Nedumudi Venu as Venu
 Zarina Wahab as Sindhu
 Bhagyasri
 Jagathi Sreekumar as Ambilykuttan
 Sankaradi as Sankaran
 Meena as Minimol
 Philomina
 Sathar as Mohan

Soundtrack
The music was composed by Raghu Kumar and the lyrics were written by Poovachal Khader.

Release

References

External links 
 
 https://web.archive.org/web/20110115070333/http://www.mallumovies.org/movie/manasariyathe
 http://www.bharatmovies.com/malayalam/info/manasariyathe.htm

1980s Malayalam-language films
1984 films
1980s horror thriller films
Indian horror thriller films
Films scored by Raghu Kumar
1984 horror films